An oil base or oil pedestal is a water, dirt and fat repellent paint, which is applied directly as a coating on the rough plaster to protect it. Mostly it consists of a coating of paint, which is based on  alkyd resin and is often applied in staircases, but also in kitchens and bathrooms of old buildings.  It is sometimes found in heavy traffic hallways.

Use 
The oil base protects the wall from soiling and the surface can be easily wiped with a damp cloth for cleaning. The wall is not damaged by wiping, dirt can not stick due to the structure of the alkyd resin based paint. Even water can not penetrate into the wall, therefore, the oil base is often found in kitchens or bathrooms of old buildings, where tiles are used today. It could also be found in hospitals and heavy-traffic areas such as hallways or staircases in public buildings.

Renewal of the oil base 
For renewal of the oil base, it cannot simply be repainted. The old oil base first has to be completely removed, along with the underlying plaster layer. This can be done for example by knocking off the top layer of the plaster or by grinding. There are also chemical solvents that peel off the paint layer. Then a new layer of plaster can be applied, and after drying, the new coat of pain can be applied  paint. Renewal of the oil base requires time due to the drying phases.

If the oil base is to be wallpapered with a wallpaper, it has to be thoroughly roughened first.

References 

Paints
Wallcoverings